The Neijiang–Kunming railway or Neikun railway, is a single-track railroad between Neijiang and Kunming in Southwest China. The line runs  from Neijiang in Sichuan province  to Kunming in Yunnan province through western Guizhou province. The Neikun Line was built in three sections. Major cities and towns along route include Neijiang, Zigong, Yibin, Shuifu, Zhaotong, Weining County, Xuanwei, Qujing and Kunming.

Rail connections
 Neijiang: Chengdu–Chongqing railway
 Meihuashan station: Shanghai–Kunming railway (Guizhou–Kunming railway)

High-speed passenger railways
The line between the Liupanshui area and Kunming has been paralleled by the Shanghai–Kunming high-speed railway since 2016. The proposed Chongqing–Kunming high-speed railway will parallel the line between Chongqing and Zhaotong and the proposed Liupanshui–Zhaotong intercity railway will parallel the line between Liupanshui and Zhaotong.

See also

 List of railways in China

References

Railway lines in China
Rail transport in Sichuan
Rail transport in Guizhou
Rail transport in Yunnan
Railway lines opened in 1960